The 1949 Western Michigan Broncos football team represented Michigan College of Education (later renamed Western Michigan University) in the Mid-American Conference (MAC) during the 1949 college football season.  In their eighth season under head coach John Gill, the Broncos compiled a 4–4 record (2–3 against MAC opponents), finished in fourth place in the MAC, and outscored their opponents, 148 to 123.  The team played its home games at Waldo Stadium in Kalamazoo, Michigan.

Guard Bob Carlson was the team captain. Safety George Dunn received the team's most outstanding player award.

Schedule

References

Western Michigan
Western Michigan Broncos football seasons
Western Michigan Broncos football